"L'Inconnue" is a short story by French author Guy de Maupassant, published in 1885.

Synopsis
On the Concorde bridge, baron Roger des Annettes meets a stranger who has "an effect... an astonishing effect" on him.

Publication
L'Inconnue was first published in the newspaper Gil Blas on January 27, 1885, before being reprised in the Monsieur Parent collection.

Publications
 Gil Blas, 1885
 Monsieur Parent - collection published in 1885 by the editor Paul Ollendorff
 Maupassant, contes et nouvelles, volume II, text established and annotated by Louis Forestier, Bibliothèque de la Pléiade, Éditions Gallimard, 1979

References

External links
 
 

Works originally published in Gil Blas (periodical)
Short stories by Guy de Maupassant
1885 short stories